The 18416 / 15 Puri–Barbil Express is an Express  train belonging to Indian Railways East Coast Railway zone that runs between  and  in India.

It operates as train number 18416 from Puri to Barbil and as train number 18415 in the reverse direction, serving the states of  Odisha & Jharkhand.

Coaches
The 18416 / 15  Puri–Barbil  Express has one AC Chair car, one Chair car, eight general unreserved & two SLR (seating with luggage rake) coaches. It does not carry a pantry car.

As is customary with most train services in India, coach composition may be amended at the discretion of Indian Railways depending on demand.

Service

Routing

Traction
As the route is electrified, a Visakhapatnam-based WAP-4 electric locomotive pulls the train to its destination.

References

External links
18416 Puri–Barbil  Express at India Rail Info
18415 Barbil–Puri  Express at India Rail Info

Express trains in India
Transport in Puri
Rail transport in Odisha
Rail transport in Jharkhand